Swamp Thing is a New Zealand blues rock duo who define themselves as a "two-man blues roots juggernaut from New Zealand", and consist of Michael Barker (formerly of the John Butler Trio) and Grant Haua.

Band members

 Michael Barker - Drums, percussion, vocals
 Grant Haua - Guitar, vocals

Discography

Albums

References

External links
Swamp Thing on Muzic.net.nz
Swamp Thing on Amplifier.co.nz
Swamp Thing Facebook page administered by Michael Barker
Swamp Thing YouTube page administered by Michael Barker

New Zealand blues rock musical groups
Musical groups established in 2010
2010 establishments in New Zealand